Operário Atlético Caarapoense, commonly known as Operário AC, is a Brazilian football club based in Caarapó, Mato Grosso do Sul. The club competes in the Campeonato Sul-Mato-Grossense Série B, the second division in the Mato Grosso do Sul state football league system.

History
The club was founded on 3 May 1952, adopting similar logo, team kits and colors as Operário Futebol Clube. Until 2022 they were known as Operário Atlético Clube and were based in Dourados.

Stadium

Operário Atlético Clube play their home games at Estádio Francisco Chaves Filho, nicknamed Chavinha, and located in Itaporã. The stadium has a maximum capacity of 3,000 people.

Until 2009, Operário Atlético Clube played their home games at Estádio Fredis Saldivar, nicknamed Douradão. The stadium has a maximum capacity of 30,000 people.

References

Association football clubs established in 1952
Football clubs in Mato Grosso do Sul
1952 establishments in Brazil